Jan Everse (8 May 1922 – 15 October 1974) was a Dutch footballer who played as a defender.

Club career
Everse played for hometown clubs HION, Neptunus, Xerxes and BVC Rotterdam as well as for Holland Sport and DFC.

International career
He was part of the Dutch squad for the 1948 Summer Olympics, but he did not play in any matches. Everse made his debut for the Netherlands in a June 1949 friendly match against Finland and earned a total of 3 caps, scoring no goals. His final international was a December 1949 friendly against Denmark.

Personal life
Everse was a cousin of Feyenoord legend Coen Moulijn. His son Jan played professionally for Feyenoord and Ajax as well as 2 games for the Netherlands in the 1970s. They were the first father and son to play for the Oranje.

References

External links
 
 Jan Everse sr. – International Appearances - RSSSF

1922 births
1974 deaths
Footballers from Rotterdam
Association football defenders
Dutch footballers
Netherlands international footballers
XerxesDZB players
FC Dordrecht players